Russkaja (stylized as ЯUSSKAJA) were a ska punk band from Vienna, Austria.  The band calls its sound "Russian Turbo Polka Metal." It has drawn on polka, ska, fanfare, pop, rock, and traditional Russian music. The band was founded in 2005 by former Stahlhammer vocalist Georgij Makazaria. Signed to the independent Austrian label Chat Chapeau since 2006, they later changed to Napalm Records. They are most known in Austria for being the stationary band of the late-night comedy show "Willkommen Österreich".

The band broke up on February 3, 2023 (the same day they released their seventh album, Turbo Polka Party) because they no longer wanted to use their "satirical use of Soviet symbols and language" during the ongoing Russian invasion of Ukraine.

Members 

 Final lineup
Georgij Makazaria – vocals
Dimitrij Miller – bass
Engel Mayr – guitar
Lea-Sophie Fischer - violin
Rainer Gutternigg – trumpet
H-G. Gutternigg – potete
Mario Stübler – drums

 Former members
Titus Vadon – drums
Zebo Adam – guitar
Antonia-Alexa Georgiew – violin
Ulrike Müllner – violin

Discography

Albums

EPs 
 Dawai, Dawai (2006)
 Barada (2013)

Singles 
 "Dope Shit" (2007)
 "More" (2008)
 "Kasatchok Superstar the Song" (2009)
 "Hammer Drive" (Download-only) (2010)
 "Rock'n'Roll Today" (2015)
 "Hey Road" (2017)
 "Alive" (2017)
 "Druschba (You're Not Alone)" (2019)
 "Russki Style" (2021)

References

See also 
 Red Elvises

Austrian heavy metal musical groups
Folk metal musical groups
Ska punk musical groups
Austrian punk rock groups
Napalm Records artists
Musical groups established in 2005
Musical groups disestablished in 2023
2005 establishments in Austria
2023 disestablishments in Austria